Hartenstein is a German surname. Notable people with the surname include:

Chuck Hartenstein (born 1942), former relief pitcher in Major League Baseball
Gustav Hartenstein (1808–1890), German philosopher and author
Isaiah Hartenstein (born 1998), German-American basketball player
Eddy Hartenstein, American CEO of Tribune Company and Los Angeles Times
, German computer pioneer
Werner Hartenstein (1908–1943), U-boat captain involved in the Laconia incident

See also
Mike Hartenstine (born 1953), American football player

German-language surnames